Metabolic age is calculated by comparing one's basal metabolic rate to the average of one's chronological age group.

All the components in the body require various levels of energy to be maintained. Body fat requires much less energy than lean muscle, as lean muscle is much more metabolically active and therefore requires more energy expenditure to remain in homeostasis. If comparing two individuals, with all variables being equal, the person with more lean muscle mass will have a higher basal metabolic rate, and therefore, a lower metabolic age in comparison to those with the identical chronological age.

According to a sports medicine specialist, "Metabolic age isn’t something we talk about in the medical community... The marker of the ultimate definition of health it is not.”

History 
The research on which the concept of metabolic age is based began with Alfred Joseph Clark in 1927.  Clark found that the pulse rate of different species of animal varied with body size to the power of −0.27.  Other researchers went on to find that other biological rates varied to the same, or a similar, coefficient.  S. Brody developed a physiological age scale in 1945.  In 1961 SCS Taylor used Brody's scale as a basis for a metabolic age scale along with taking 0.27 as a standard for the calculation.  Taylor thus defines metabolic age,  as,

where
 is the standard adult body weight in kilograms
 is the time from conception
 is a dimensional coefficient that depends on the units of time being used

Taylor chose the term metabolic age as a nod to the work of Max Kleiber who used the term metabolic time.

References

Senescence